The women's singles tournament of the 2014 BWF World Championships (World Badminton Championships) took place from August 25 to 31. Ratchanok Inthanon enters as the 2013 World Champion.

Seeds

  Li Xuerui (final)
  Wang Shixian (quarterfinals)
  Wang Yihan (third round)
  Ratchanok Intanon (third round)
  Sung Ji-hyun (quarterfinals)
  Bae Youn-joo (third round)
  Saina Nehwal (quarterfinals)
  Tai Tzu-ying (quarterfinals)

  Carolina Marín (champion)
  Porntip Buranaprasertsuk (second round)
  Pusarla Venkata Sindhu (semifinals)
  Han Li (third round)
  Sayaka Takahashi (third round)
  Nichaon Jindapon (second round)
  Eriko Hirose (first round, withdrew)
  Minatsu Mitani (semifinals)

Draw

Finals

Section 1

Section 2

Section 3

Section 4

References
BWF Website

2014 BWF World Championships
BWF